West of Sonora is a 1948 American Western film directed by Ray Nazarro and written by Barry Shipman. The film stars Charles Starrett, Steve Darrell, George Chesebro, Anita Castle and Smiley Burnette. The film was released on March 25, 1948, by Columbia Pictures.

Plot

Cast          
Charles Starrett as Steve Rollins / The Durango Kid
Steve Darrell as Black Murphy
George Chesebro as Sheriff Jeff Clinton
Anita Castle as Penelope Clinton
Smiley Burnette as Smiley Burnette

References

External links
 

1948 films
1940s English-language films
American Western (genre) films
1948 Western (genre) films
Columbia Pictures films
Films directed by Ray Nazarro
American black-and-white films
1940s American films